Europipe II is a natural gas pipeline from the Kårstø processing plant north of Stavanger to a receiving terminal at Dornum in Germany. It came on stream on 1 October 1999.

Route
It starts from Kårstø processing plant and runs about  onshore from Kårstø to Vestre Bokn. At Dornum the gas is supplied into the Netra (Norddeutsche Erdgas Transversale) gas pipeline, which runs to Salzwedel in eastern Germany.

Technical description
Most of the gas is supplied from Equinor's Åsgard, Sleipner East/West, Gullfaks and Statfjord fields.  

The Europipe II pipeline was laid by Semac I, Castoro Sei and Solitaire pipe-laying ships. Europipe II was commissioned in 1999 and it cost 9.6 billion NOK. The pipeline is operated by Gassco, the technical service provider is Equinor. It was built with an option to branch out to a separate pipeline to Denmark. A pipeline end manifold was installed in April 2022 for the Baltic Pipe to Poland.

See also

 Europipe I
 MIDAL

References

External links
 europipe II, Gassco website 

Energy infrastructure completed in 1999
North Sea energy
Natural gas pipelines in Germany
Natural gas pipelines in Norway
Germany–Norway relations
Pipelines under the North Sea
1999 establishments in Germany
1999 establishments in Norway

de:Europipe Gasleitung